Sebastiaan Weenink (born 27 August 1986 in Rotterdam) is a professional squash player from the Netherlands. He reached a career-high world ranking of World No. 82 in the February 2015.

References

External links 
 
 
 

1986 births
Living people
Dutch male squash players
Sportspeople from Rotterdam